Asyut Petroleum Sports Club, commonly referred to as Petrol Asyout, is an Egyptian football based in Asyut, Egypt, currently competing in the Egyptian Second Division.

In 2008–2009 season, they reached the Egypt Cup semi-final, only to get knocked out on the 27th of January 2009.

Current squad 

Football clubs in Egypt
Association football clubs established in 1990
1990 establishments in Egypt
Sports clubs in Egypt